Agrostis pallens is a species of grass known by the common name seashore bentgrass.

Distribution
It is native to western North America from British Columbia to Montana to California, where it grows in many types of habitat, typically open meadows, woodlands, subalpine areas, and other dry habitats. The diploid number of the grass is either 42 or 56.

Description
It is occasionally rhizomatous. The palea is either absent or vestigial.

The grass blooms from April into May.

References

External links
Jepson Manual Treatment — Agrostis pallens
 UC Photos gallery — Agrostis pallens

pallens
Bunchgrasses of North America
Grasses of the United States
Grasses of Canada
Native grasses of California
Flora of the Northwestern United States
Flora of Nevada
Flora of British Columbia
Flora of the Rocky Mountains
Flora of the Sierra Nevada (United States)
Natural history of the California chaparral and woodlands
Natural history of the California Coast Ranges
Garden plants of North America
Plants described in 1882